Nadira Sultan is an Indian politician. She was elected to Patiyali in the 2022 Uttar Pradesh Legislative Assembly election as a member of the Samajwadi Party.

Personal life
Nadira Sultan was born in Sahawar Town on 11 November and is the only child of politician and freedom fighter Late Mushir Ahmad Khan and Late Saad Fatima Khan. Her Father was twice MP from Etha and kasganj. Her Unlce Late Mohammad Zamir Khan was MLA and her maternal Uncle Late Ahmed Loot Khan was Minister in Uttar Pradesh. She was married to Dr Abdul Hafeez Khan from Rampur whoes Uncle is Ex Minister Mohammad Azam Khan.

Political career
In the 2022 Uttar Pradesh Legislative Assembly election, Nadira Sultan represented Samajwadi Party as a candidate from Patiyali and went on to defeating three times sitting MLA of Bharatiya Janata Party's Mamtesh Shakya.
On 27 December 2022, she was awared the membership of "Joint Committee for Women and Child Development" in Uttar Pradesh.

References

Living people
Uttar Pradesh MLAs 2022–2027
Women members of the Uttar Pradesh Legislative Assembly
Samajwadi Party politicians
1956 births
21st-century Indian women politicians